Blue Cove is a settlement in Newfoundland and Labrador.

Populated places in Newfoundland and Labrador
Populated coastal places in Canada